Salman Farooq (born 26 November 1981) is a Pakistani-born cricketer who played for the United Arab Emirates national cricket team. He made his One Day International debut for the United Arab Emirates against Afghanistan on 30 November 2014. Farooq was a part of the UAE squad for the Asia Cup in 2008 held in Pakistan and named in the squad for the 2015 ICC Cricket World Cup. He has also represented the UAE under-19 cricket team in the Youth Asia Cup.

References

External links
 

1981 births
Living people
Emirati cricketers
United Arab Emirates One Day International cricketers
Cricketers from Karachi
Pakistani emigrants to the United Arab Emirates
Pakistani expatriate sportspeople in the United Arab Emirates